Académie Génération Foot, also called Association Sportive Génération Foot is an association football club founded in 2000 in Dakar, Senegal. The Stade Déni Biram Ndao, which has a capacity of 1,001, is their home stadium.

History
Académie Génération Foot Amara Touré was founded on 2000 in Dakar by Mady Touré. The club took the name of Amara Touré, the father of Mady.

Squad

Achievements
Senegal Premier League: 2
 2017, 2019.
Senegal FA Cup: 2
 2015, 2018.
Trophée des Champions du Sénégal: 1
 2017.
Super Coupe du Sénégal: 2
 2017, 2018.

Performance in CAF competitions
CAF Champions League: 2 appearances

2018 – First Round
2019-20 – First Round

CAF Confederation Cup: 1 appearances
2016 – Preliminary round

Notable alumni
More than 30 athletes who have trained at the Académie Génération Foot have gone on to become professional footballers. Among them, notable players include:

  Moustapha Bayal Sall
  Landry N'Guemo
  Momar N'Diaye
  Cheikh Gueye
  Babacar Gueye
  Papiss Cissé
  Fallou Diagne
  Diafra Sakho
  Sadio Mané
  Ismaïla Sarr
  Ibrahima Niane
  Pape Matar Sarr

References

External links
Official website 

Football clubs in Senegal
Association football clubs established in 2000
2000 establishments in Senegal